Stian Vatne (born 10 May 1974) is a Norwegian handball player, currently playing for the German club Füchse Berlin.

He started his club career in Molde HK, and later played for Stavanger IF, Kadetten Schaffhausen, Ademar León, Algeciras BM and CAI BM Aragón.

He made his debut on the Norwegian national team in 1994, and has played 71 matches and scored 120 goals.

References
Profile at the Norwegian Handball Association (Retrieved on 4 August 2008)

1974 births
Living people
Norwegian male handball players
People from Molde
Liga ASOBAL players
Sportspeople from Møre og Romsdal